Erika Flores (born November 2, 1978, in Grass Valley, Nevada County, California) is an American former child actress and former actress, and sister of Melissa Flores, also a former child actress.

Career
She is known for her role as the first Colleen Cooper in the Dr. Quinn, Medicine Woman TV series; Flores left the role in 1995, in the middle of the third season, and the role was then recast with Jessica Bowman taking over as Colleen.

Flores guest-starred on the Star Trek: The Next Generation episode "Disaster". She played Marissa Flores, one of three young science-fair winners aboard the USS Enterprise.

In January 2009, Flores guest starred and had her last role as Sarah, the main patient in "Big Baby", a fifth-season episode of the Fox show, House.

She also made appearances on Dear John, Empty Nest, Step by Step, and CSI: Miami.

Personal life
She married Bartlett E. "Bart" Burson on July 1, 2006, and has two children.

Filmography

References

External links
 
 
 
 

1979 births
20th-century American actresses
21st-century American actresses
Actresses from California
People from Grass Valley, California
American child actresses
American television actresses
Living people